Timmaspe is a municipality in the district of Rendsburg-Eckernförde, in Schleswig-Holstein, Germany.

The location of Timmaspe is south of the municipality of Schülp bei Nortorf, but north of Wasbek, and east of Gnutz.

References

Municipalities in Schleswig-Holstein
Rendsburg-Eckernförde